Sallu ki Shaadi is an Indian Hindi-language romantic action film directed by Mohammad Israr Ansari. The film stars Kashyap Barbhaya, Arshin Mehta, Zeenat Aman and Asrani, with Razak Khan and Kiran Kumar in supporting roles. Dedicated to Salman Khan, Sallu ki Shaadi was released on 8 December 2017.

Release
The film was released worldwide on 8 December 2017.

Plot 
Zeenat and Shahnawaz meet each other at a film theatre in 1989, during a screening of Salman Khan's Maine Pyar Kiya, and fall in love. They marry, and live happily with their children Sallu and Ilmi, until Shahnawaz dies of cancer. Twenty years later, Zeenat wants to honour Shahnawaz's final wish, which is to find a suitable girl for their son Sallu and get him married. The only problem is that Sallu is a die-hard fan of his namesake and has resolved that he will remain a bachelor for as long as his idol does.

Cast

 Kashyap Barbhaya as Sallu
 Zeenat Aman as Sallu's Mother
 Kiran Kumar as Sallu's Father
 Asrani 
 Razzak Khan 
 Arvind Kumar
 Arshin Mehta
 Ravi Pandey
 Ranjana Khatiwada
 Samiksha
 Gauahar Khan 
 Sandeep Aanand
 Sandeep Singh Bhadouria
 Vivek Modi as Guilty Man

Soundtrack

Track listing

References

External links

2017 films
2010s Hindi-language films
2010s romantic action films
Indian romantic action films
Films shot in Dubai